Heather Rattray is an American actress who has starred in several movies and soap operas. Her acting career began when she was 11 years old, when she was discovered by a film producer.

She has appeared in several family features co-starring with Robert Logan, including Across the Great Divide, Mountain Family Robinson, Suburb in the Wild, and The Sea Gypsies. Rattray portrayed Lily Walsh on the soap opera As the World Turns from 1989 to 1993. She also had a recurring role on Guiding Light.

Rattray's elder brother, Laird Macintosh (he uses their mother's maiden name), is also an actor.

Filmography
The Theory of the Leisure Class (2001)
Alright Already (1997) TV Series (Episode: Again with the Sponge Cake)
The Home Court (1996) TV Series (Episode: Between a Shamrock and a Hard Place)
As the World Turns (1989-1993) TV Series
Basket Case 2 (1990)
Guiding Light (1988) TV Series
Mountain Family Robinson  (1979)
The Sea Gypsies  (1978)
The Further Adventures of the Wilderness Family  (1978)
Across the Great Divide (1976)

References

External links

American child actresses
American film actresses
American soap opera actresses
American television actresses
Living people
People from Moline, Illinois
Actresses from Illinois
Year of birth missing (living people)
21st-century American women